Pesterzsébet is the 20th district of Budapest, Hungary. It is located in the southern part of the capital and is the 17th biggest district in the city. It is a mostly suburban area with approximately 70,000 residents.

History

Pesterzsébet was named until 1924 Erzsébetfalva, with a brief period of being called Leninváros during the Hungarian Soviet Republic, 1924-1932 Pesterzsébet, 1932-1950 Pestszenterzsébet, 1950-1990 Pesterzsébet.

Sport 
The most popular sport in this town is association football. The town had one team playing in the top level of the Hungarian football league system, the Nemzeti Bajnokság I. The name of the team was Erzsébeti TC, which played in the 1925-26 season.

List of mayors

Gallery

Twin towns
Pesterzsébet is twinned with:
  Frankfurt-Nord-Ost, Germany
  Olgiate Comasco, Italy
   Belin, Romania
   Cristuru Secuiesc, Romania
  Alushta, Ukraine
  Nowa Słupia, Poland

See also
List of districts in Budapest

References

External links 
 Official homepage of Pesterzsébet
 Aerial photographs
 Picture gallery

 
Urban planning in Hungary